Thailand participated in the 2014 Asian Games in Incheon, South Korea from 19 September to 4 October 2014.

Medal summary

Medals by sport

Medalists

The following Thai competitors won medals at the games.

| width="78%" align="left" valign="top" |

| width="22%" align="left" valign="top" |

Archery

Men

Athletics

Badminton

Men

Women

Mixed

Boxing

Men

Women

Golf

Sepaktakraw

Taekwondo

Men

Women

Tennis

Men

Women

Mixed

Volleyball

Weightlifting

References

Nations at the 2014 Asian Games
2014
Asian Games